As It Is may refer to:

 As It Is (album), by John Taylor and Palle Danielsson, 1996
 As It Is (band), a British-American rock band formed in 2012
 As It Is, a 2010 short film starring Shelli Boone

See also
 "As It Was", a 2022 song by Harry Styles